Cyperus pseudosomaliensis is a species of sedge that is endemic to northern Somalia in Africa.

The species was first formally described by the botanist Georg Kükenthal in 1936.

See also
 List of Cyperus species

References

pseudosomaliensis
Plants described in 1936
Taxa named by Georg Kükenthal
Flora of Somalia